Redjean Clerc (born ) is a Swiss male weightlifter, competing in the 77 kg category and representing Switzerland at international competitions. He competed at world championships, most recently at the 1999 World Weightlifting Championships.

Major results

References

1970 births
Living people
Swiss male weightlifters
Place of birth missing (living people)